is a Japanese long-distance runner. He competed in the marathon at the 1976 Summer Olympics.

References

External links
 

1947 births
Living people
Athletes (track and field) at the 1976 Summer Olympics
Japanese male long-distance runners
Japanese male marathon runners
Olympic athletes of Japan
Place of birth missing (living people)
20th-century Japanese people